The  New York–Pennsylvania League season was the league's first season of play. The Williamsport Billies became the New York–Pennsylvania League's (Now Eastern League) first champions by having the best record at the end of the regular season. The New York–Pennsylvania League played at the Class B Level during this season.

Final standings

Stats

Batting leaders

Pitching leaders

New York-Pennsylvania League Season, 1923
Eastern League seasons
Eastern League (1938–present)